The Poetry Society of America's National Chapbook Fellowship is awarded once a year to two American poets under 30 years of age who have yet to publish a first book of poems. Two renowned poets select and introduce a winning manuscript for publication. Each winner receives an additional $1000 prize.

Winners 
2009:
 A History of Waves by Haines Eason, selected by Mark Doty
 The Good News of the Ground by Heidi Johannesen Poon, selected by Cole Swensen

2008:
 Blue House by Christopher Nelson, selected by Mary Jo Bang
 Swerve by John Estes, selected by C.K. Williams

2007:
 Dear Wild Abandon by Andrew Michael Roberts, selected by Mark Strand
 Dream of Water by Kate Ingold, selected by Haryette Mullen

2006:
 Mayport by Maureen Thorson, selected by Heather McHugh
 The Eights by Dan Chelotti, selected by Yusef Komunyakaa

2005
 Guarding the Violins by Misty Harper, selected by Charles Simic
 What Remains by Stuart Greenhouse, selected by Brenda Hillman

2004
 Meditations by Joshua Poteat, selected by Mary Oliver
 Woman in a Boat by K. E. Allen, selected by Robert Creeley

2003
 Rowing Through Fog by Kerri Webster, selected by Carl Phillips
 The Morning Hour by Dawn Lundy Martin, selected by C. D. Wright

American poetry awards